12 Boötis is a spectroscopic binary in the constellation Boötes.  It is approximately 122 light years from Earth.

12 Boötis is a yellow-white F-type subgiant with an apparent magnitude of +4.82. It is a spectroscopic binary pair which orbit around its centre of mass once every 9.6045 days, with an estimated separation of 0.0035".

A further companion, 12 Boötis B, was reported with a separation of approximately one arcsecond in 1989, but subsequent surveys have repeatedly failed to detect this companion.

References

See also
 Image 12 Boötis

123999
Spectroscopic binaries
069226
Bootis, d
Bootis, 12
Durchmusterung objects
5304
Boötes
F-type subgiants
9470